The women's shot put event at the 2007 Pan American Games was held on July 27.

Results

References
Official results

Shot
2007
2007 in women's athletics